Emanuele Pesaresi (born 10 December 1976) is a former Italian footballer who last played Ancona 1905 in Serie D. He was a fast and aggressive defender who was known for his quick pace and counterattacking ability.

Club career
Pesaresi started his career at hometown club Ancona of Serie B.

Sampdoria
In 1995, he signed for Sampdoria of Serie A. After no appearance in 1998–99 season, he left for Napoli of Serie B on loan. In 1999–2000 season, he returned to Sampdoria, but at Serie B.

Lazio
In 2000, he signed for Lazio of Serie A. He just played twice in Serie A 2000–01. In the next season he left for S.L. Benfica on loan.

Chievo
In 2002, he signed for Chievo of Serie A, as part of Christian Manfredini's deal. He played 7 league appearances in 2002–03 season. He then left for Ternana of Serie B on loan, where he played 22 matches.

Serie B
After played once in 2004–05 season, he left again to Torino of Serie B in January 2005. He then stayed in Serie B for Pescara and Triestina. In 2007–08 season, he signed a new contract with Triestina. He played 24 start in 27 appearances.

Late career
In 2008–09 season, he played for Cremonese at Lega Pro Prima Divisione.

After being out of contract for almost a year, he agreed to join amateurs Piano San Lazzaro of Eccellenza Marche for the final part of the 2009–10 season.

Also for the 2010–11 season he plays, as captain, with the same team, which in summer 2010 it has become Ancona 1905, after the radiation of A.C. Ancona.

International career
Pesaresi won a gold medal at the 1997 Mediterranean Games with the Italy U-21 team.

References

External links
 FIGC 
 

Italian footballers
A.C. Ancona players
U.C. Sampdoria players
S.S.C. Napoli players
S.S. Lazio players
S.L. Benfica footballers
A.C. ChievoVerona players
Ternana Calcio players
Torino F.C. players
Delfino Pescara 1936 players
U.S. Triestina Calcio 1918 players
U.S. Cremonese players
U.S. Ancona 1905 players
Serie A players
Serie B players
Serie C players
Primeira Liga players
Italy youth international footballers
Italy under-21 international footballers
Expatriate footballers in Portugal
Italian expatriate sportspeople in Portugal
Association football defenders
1976 births
Sportspeople from the Province of Ancona
Living people
Mediterranean Games gold medalists for Italy
Mediterranean Games medalists in football
Competitors at the 1997 Mediterranean Games
Footballers from Marche